Charles Murray Higson (born 3 July 1958) is an English actor, comedian, author and former singer. He has also written and produced for television and is the author of the Enemy book series, as well as the first five novels in the Young Bond series.

Early life 
Born in Frome, Somerset, Higson was educated at Sevenoaks School, Kent and at the University of East Anglia (UEA) in Norwich (where his brother taught from 1986 to 2008, latterly as Professor of Film Studies). At UEA, Higson met Paul Whitehouse, David Cummings and Terry Edwards. Higson, Cummings and Edwards formed the band The Higsons, of which Higson was the lead singer from 1980 to 1986. They released two singles on the Specials' 2 Tone Records label. This was after he had formed the punk band The Right Hand Lovers, wherein he performed as "Switch". Higson then started squatting in London and became a decorator, including decorating the house of Stephen Fry and Hugh Laurie.

Career 
Higson started writing for Harry Enfield with Paul Whitehouse and performing comedy. He came to public attention as one of the main writers and performers of the BBC Two sketch show The Fast Show (1994–2000). He also worked with Whitehouse on the radio comedy Down the Line. In 1994 Higson co-wrote (with Lise Mayer) the screenplay for the film thriller Suite 16.

He worked as producer, writer, director and occasional guest star on Randall & Hopkirk from 2000 to 2001. Subsequent television work has included writing and starring in BBC Three's Fast Show spin-off sitcom Swiss Toni. He has starred in Tittybangbang on BBC Three and first appeared as a panellist on QI in 2007. In 2010 he co-directed and starred in the series Bellamy's People.

In 2013 Higson adapted Agatha Christie's A Caribbean Mystery for ITV's Agatha Christie's Marple series. In an addition to the plot, Miss Marple attends a talk given by the ornithologist James Bond (played by Higson himself): there she meets Ian Fleming, who is inspired to borrow the speaker's name for the protagonist of his new novel, Casino Royale. In 2015 Higson reimagined the novel Strange Case of Dr Jekyll and Mr Hyde by Robert Louis Stevenson for ITV Studios into a ten part adventure series, set in the 1930s titled Jekyll and Hyde. In 2017, Higson appeared as Ian Winterman in series three of Broadchurch and as Ronnie Maguire in series three of Grantchester.

2020 saw Higson compete on Richard Osman's House of Games. alongside Chizzy Akudolu, Kate Williams and Tom Allen.

Higson has also starred in Lobby Land, a radio sitcom on BBC Radio 4, as Tom Shriver MP.

Books 
Higson published many novels through the early to mid-1990s which take a slightly dystopian look at everyday life and have a considerably more adult tone than his other work, with characters on the margins of society finding themselves spiralling out of control. This has led Time Out to describe him as "The missing link between Dick Emery and Bret Easton Ellis".

Higson wrote a series of five Young Bond novels, aimed at younger readers and concentrating on the James Bond's school-days at Eton starting with SilverFin, released in 2005, and ending with By Royal Command (2008). Higson had been at school with Jonathan Evans, former Director General of MI5.

Higson wrote a post-apocalyptic, zombie-horror series of books for young adults. The eponymous first book in the series, titled The Enemy, was released in 2009.
At a school event at Abingdon School on 14 September 2011, Charlie told children: "Originally it was going to be three books and then my publisher, Puffin, said make it five, and now we're up to it being seven." The seventh novel, The End, was published in 2015.

In 2018 Higson wrote a Fighting Fantasy gamebook titled The Gates of Death, which was published by Scholastic books as part of their campaign to relaunch the Fighting Fantasy franchise. He is a long term FF enthusiast, having attended Fighting Fantasy Fest 2 in London the previous year and also made a cameo appearance in the Ian Livingstone gamebook Blood of the Zombies.

Personal life 
Higson lives in London with his wife and three sons.

Filmography

Film

Television

Bibliography

Novels 
King of the Ants (1992) 
 Happy Now (1993) 
 Full Whack (1995), 
Getting Rid of Mister Kitchen (1996) 
Monstroso (2010)

The Enemy

The Enemy novels 
The Enemy (2009) 
The Dead (2010) 
The Fear (2011) 
The Sacrifice (2012) 
The Fallen (2013) 
The Hunted (2014) 
The End (2015) ASIN B00Z8PHRKS

The Enemy short story 
Geeks vs. Zombies (2012)  (This companion book in the series, released by Disney Hyperion, portrays an exclusive scene from The Fear, on World Book Day.)

Young Bond 
SilverFin (2005), 
Blood Fever (2006), 
Double or Die (2007), 
Hurricane Gold (2007), 
By Royal Command (2008), 
SilverFin: The Graphic Novel (2008),  (with Kev Walker)
Danger Society: The Young Bond Dossier (2009),  (authored short story included in book)

Fighting Fantasy 
 The Gates of Death (2018)

Non-fiction 
The 'Fast Show' Book (0006),  (with Paul Whitehouse)

Short stories 
"The Red Line" in The 'Time Out' Book of Short Stories, edited by Maria Lexton (1993),

References

External links 

BBC Talent Guide profile 
Another BBC profile of Higson
Higson profile at MI6.co.uk – interview series and biography

New interview (2008): Charlie in Command
Charlie Higson Archive, University of East Anglia

1958 births
Living people
People from Frome
People educated at Sevenoaks School
Alumni of the University of East Anglia
English male television actors
English male comedians
English male singers
English children's writers
English comedy writers
English television writers
21st-century English writers
20th-century English novelists
21st-century British novelists
Musicians from Somerset
Male actors from Somerset
Musicians from Kent
Male actors from Kent
20th-century squatters
British sketch comedians
The Fast Show
British male television writers